The Pickle Bridge line is a disused railway route in Northern England that ran between  Huddersfield and Bradford.

History

Wyke viaduct

The line was authorised in 1865 and amended 1873. Construction started in 1874.

Wyke viaduct (locally known as Red Lion viaduct) was by far the largest engineering feature on the line, a 22 arch  stone construction built by Hawkshaw & Meek. Unfortunately it was an unnecessary diversion around an unfriendly landowner across unsuitable ground. It suffered from subsidence due to local mine workings and a speed limit was imposed, followed by diversion of all passenger services in 1948 and complete closure of the line in 1952. The viaduct continued to deteriorate and British Rail applied for permission to partly demolish it, as by this time it was grade II listed. This permission was granted and the 14 arches at the northern end of the viaduct were demolished in 1987. Today, the viaduct is owned by BRB (Residuary) Ltd.

The route

 Heading west and diverging north at Anchor Pit Junction.
 Crossing the River Calder and swinging west to:
 Clifton Road (Opened 1 March 1881, closed 14 September 1931, demolished 1934).
 Heading north over a 5 arch viaduct at Thornhills and continuing north to:
  (Opened 1 March 1881, closed 1917, burned down 1929).
 Crossing over Wyke Viaduct (partly demolished 1987).

References

Closed railway lines in Yorkshire and the Humber
Rail transport in West Yorkshire
Transport in Calderdale
Transport in the City of Bradford